National Highway 305, commonly called NH 305 is a national highway in  India. It is a branch of National Highway 5. NH-305 traverses the state of Himachal Pradesh in India.

Geography 
National Highway 305 is located in higher altitudes in Himachal Pradesh. The passage remains closed for four months during winters due to heavy snowfall in higher reaches, especially at the 10,800 ft high Jalori Pass. This highway provides connection to Seraj Valley.

Route 
Sainj- Luhri- Anni -Jalori- Aut.

Junctions  
 
 Terminal with National Highway 5 (Old NH22) near Sainj.
 Terminal with National Highway 3 (Old NH21) near Aut.

See also 
 List of National Highways in India by highway number

References  

National highways in India
National Highways in Himachal Pradesh